is a German typographical term for the insertion of inappropriate spaces before a punctuation mark.

Etymology
 is derived as a borrowed word from the English blank.

Usage

 was once a common practice in Germany due to the conventional approximation there on typewriters of the standard type-setter's spacing rules.  These use a variety of different-width spaces and insert a thin space or hair space between words and most punctuation marks. With the introduction of the typewriter and its fixed-width space, English-language typists removed most spaces around punctuation marks, but some other languages' typists, including French and German, did not.

Simplistic computer tools typically mishandle  by treating them as ordinary whitespace, potentially inserting incorrect linebreaks and wrapping the punctuation mark onto the next line, rendering the text difficult to read. However, such spacing behaviour is not necessarily replicated for other languages and their typists must manually enter non-breaking spaces.

 is increasingly discouraged among German-language typists.

Examples
 
 
 Illustrating word-wrapping problems:
 You are here ! I am here
 , too ! You are just ing
 !

See also
  on the German Wikipedia
 Sentence spacing
 Punctuation in French
 French spacing & English spacing – different spacing rules
 Non-breaking space
 Quotation mark - According to national conventions, mark may be separated from the quoted text using plenken.

References

Bedeutung und Herkunft der Wörter Plenk, plenken
Was ist 'Plenken'?
DIN 5008, Schreib- und Gestaltungsregeln für die Textverarbeitung

Typography
Punctuation
Whitespace
1988 neologisms